The 1977–78 Scottish First Division season was won by Morton, who were promoted along with Heart of Midlothian to  the Premier Division. Alloa Athletic and East Fife were relegated to the Second Division.

Table

References

Scottish First Division seasons
2
Scot